The Seventh Coin is a 1993 independent film directed by Dror Soref and starring Peter O'Toole.

Production
The film is filmed in Jerusalem, Israel, and with the help of Paramount, The Seventh Coin became Soref's debut as a feature film writer/director.

Plot
Peter O'Toole is Emil Saber, a retired British soldier and collector of ancient coins and Biblical artifacts. To complete his collection of king Herod's coins, Emil travels to Jerusalem to seek out the seventh and final one. In his search for the coin, Emil begins to lose his mind and eventually believes that he is the reincarnated Herod himself. 
This does not go well for two teenagers who possess the coin, American tourist Ronnie and Arab pickpocket Salim. As Emil continues on his murderous rampage, the teenagers must avoid him while also protecting the coin.

Reception
Stephen Holden, writing for The New York Times, described The Seventh Coin as having "plenty of snazzy local color but no idea what kind of film it wants to be".

The film won two festival awards including Best First Time Director at the Philadelphia Film Festival and the Silver Awards at Worldfest Houston.

References

External links

 

1993 films
American independent films
Israeli independent films
English-language Israeli films
1990s English-language films
1990s adventure films
Films set in Jerusalem
Treasure hunt films
1993 directorial debut films
1993 independent films
1990s American films